Unsupervised is an American adult animated sitcom created by David Hornsby, Rob Rosell, and Scott Marder which ran on FX from January 19 to December 20, 2012. The show was created, and for the most part, written by David Hornsby, Scott Marder, and Rob Rosell.

On November 17, 2012, the series was canceled after one season.

Plot
The series follows two 15-year-old best friends, Gary and Joel, as they try to navigate through teenage life while also trying to do the right thing without the help of any parental supervision.

Cast and characters
 Gary G. (voiced by Justin Long): Gary's father has abandoned him and he lives with his pot-smoking stepmother, who is often absent and takes no responsibility for him when she is physically present. Gary is very idealistic and he and his friend Joel always support each other.
 Joel Zymanski (voiced by David Hornsby): Generally more excitable than Gary, and a little less mature, Joel lacks subtlety. An optimistic humanitarian like Gary, Joel loves to dance and is particularly proud of his ability to spin on the spot.
 Megan McKinley (voiced by Kristen Bell): A mature but selfish and self-centered student who wants to be popular and "cool." She complains about her well-meaning but permissive mother.
 Darius Jenkins (voiced by Romany Malco): An excellent student who is defensive about his weight. Darius is a realist (except where his weight is concerned). He has a strict mother.
 Russ Brown (voiced by Rob Rosell): A mentally ill, impulsive classmate of Gary and Joel's. He perpetually has one arm in a cast and sniffs the cast when he's uneasy. Comes from a broken, utterly impoverished home and has multiple siblings.

Recurring
 Carol (voiced by Kaitlin Olson), Gary's irresponsible stepmother who barely notices he exists and gives him no support or stability.
 Danielle (voiced by Kaitlin Olson), also called "Rocket Tits", a disinterested student at Maynord High, considered a lust-interest of Joel Zymanski and sometime best friend of Megan McKinley.
 Martin Rivera (voiced by Fred Armisen), Gary's middle-aged Latino next-door neighbor, a widower who works insane hours at a soul-crushing job and is always heavily sweating.
 Christina Rivera (voiced by Alexa Vega), Martin's rude, rebellious teenage daughter.
 Rachel (voiced by Maria Bamford), Christina's friend.
 Jojo Venetti (voiced by Scott Marder), the toughest kid in school; a bully who gets wasted with any/every substance available.
 Mrs. McKinley (voiced by Maria Bamford), Megan's liberal mother, who enthusiastically encourages her non-rebellious daughter to engage in all manner of irresponsible teenage behavior, including partying and dating.
 Sid (voiced by André Sogliuzzo), Gary's tough Australian neighbor, a retired ecological /corporate lawyer and kangaroo researcher (the show implies his relationship with kangaroos involves bestiality).
 Dirt (voiced by Glenn Howerton), Jojo's friend, a slightly-old "bad" boy.
 Principal Margaret Stark (voiced by Sally Kellerman), the cynical and corrupt principal of Maynord High, Gary and Joel's school. Nicknamed "The Skunk" because of the white stripe in her hair.
 Coach Durham (voiced by Clifton Powell), the baseball coach (and teacher) who lives in his car just outside the school field.

Production
Unsupervised was created by David Hornsby, Scott Marder, and Rob Rosell, who also serve as executive producers alongside Adam Reed, Matt Thompson, Rob McElhenney, Glenn Howerton, and Charlie Day. The series was produced by Floyd County Productions (who also handled animation services), RCG Productions, and FX Productions.

Unsupervised appeared on the FX Network development slate in March 2011 under the title Townies, and was eyed as a companion to the current FX animated comedy Archer. On September 15, 2011, the series was given a series order of 13 episodes under the new title Unsupervised. Hornsby, Rosell, and Marder were the executive producers, with Rosell and Marder acting as show-runners. Musician DJsNeverEndingStory was hired as the composer for the animation's hip-hop-influenced music.

On October 17, 2011, FX released a preview trailer of Unsupervised titled "Fresh Men". The series premiered on January 19, 2012, at 10:30pm following Archer. FX officially announced the season finale to be aired on March 22, 2012, bringing the first season to 10 episodes.

Later, the 3 remaining episodes, which were scheduled to be aired between "Jesse Judge Lawncare Incorporated" and "Youngbloods", were written during the first production cycle. However, due to a production issue with Archer, they were postponed in conjunction with FX wanting to end the two shows in sync. These episodes ultimately aired from December 6–20, 2012. In November 2012, Hornsby and Howerton confirmed on Twitter that the show would not be renewed for a second season. Reruns of the series briefly aired on Cartoon Network's Adult Swim programming block in 2015.

Episodes

Reception
Unsupervised received many mixed to negative reviews from critics upon its premiere with its pilot, holding a 3.5 or "Awful" rating on IGN. Alan Sepinwall gave the show a mixed review, noting that he liked the way Gary and Joel (and their classmates, generally) were presented as decent kids, instead of default stereotypes of poor troublemakers, but that the show was not also that funny. Although critics were disappointed with the premiere, later episodes of the season were given much higher marks, with The A.V. Club giving the season one finale an A−. Currently, Unsupervised holds a 46 out of 100 score, based on 16 reviews, from Metacritic.

References

External links
 

2010s American adult animated television series
2010s American animated comedy television series
2010s American teen sitcoms
2012 American television series debuts
2012 American television series endings
American adult animated comedy television series
American animated sitcoms
American flash adult animated television series
English-language television shows
FX Networks original programming
Teen animated television series
Television series by 20th Century Fox Television
Television series by Fox Television Animation